The 2018 season was the Cincinnati Bengals' 49th season in the National Football League, their 51st overall and their 16th and final under head coach Marvin Lewis. The Bengals failed to improve upon their 2017 campaign as they collapsed to a 6–10 finish (after a 4–1 start) to finish in 4th place in the AFC North. This marks the 3rd consecutive season the Bengals have failed to make the playoffs.

Longtime coach Marvin Lewis and team owner Mike Brown announced a mutual parting of ways following this season after 16 seasons, and despite leading them to 4 division titles, and 7 winning seasons/playoff appearances, Lewis was unable to lead the Bengals to a playoff win. He holds the record for most wins, seasons, and playoff losses for a head coach without a playoff win.

Offseason

Free agents

Unrestricted

Signings

Departures

Draft

Draft trades
 The Bengals traded their first- and sixth-round selections (12th and 187th overall) to Buffalo in exchange for Buffalo's first- and fifth-round selections and tackle Cordy Glenn
 The Bengals traded a conditional selection to Jacksonville in exchange for defensive end Chris Smith. As Smith was on the Bengals' active roster for at least six games during the 2017 season, Jacksonville acquired Cincinnati's seventh-round selection (230th overall).
 The Bengals traded linebacker Marquis Flowers to New England in exchange for New England's seventh-round selection (249th overall).
 The Bengals traded their 2nd round pick (46th overall) and a 3rd round pick (100th overall) to the Kansas City Chiefs in exchange for the Chiefs' 2nd round pick (54th overall) and 3rd round pick (78th overall).

Undrafted free agents

Staff

Final roster

Roster changes
 August 2: Released WR Brandon LaFell after two seasons with the team.
 August 19: Released S George Iloka, who started every game the past two seasons. Iloka spent his first six years in the league with the Bengals.
 August 24: Terminated the contract of DT Chris Baker, who was signed this past offseason as a free agent.

NFL Top 100

Preseason

Regular season

Schedule

Note: Intra-division opponents are in bold text.

Game summaries

Week 1: at Indianapolis Colts

The Bengals opened the 2018 NFL season in Indianapolis. After trading field goals in the first quarter, the Colts took the lead on Andrew Luck's first touchdown pass since Week 17 of the 2016 NFL season to TE Eric Ebron. After Indianapolis added another Adam Vinatieri field goal, Cincinnati trailed 13-3 in the second quarter before WR John Ross caught a 3-yard TD pass from Andy Dalton for his first career NFL catch and touchdown. The Colts took a 23-10 lead in the third quarter after a T. Y. Hilton TD catch, but the Bengals went on to score 17 unanswered points, including touchdowns by A. J. Green and Joe Mixon, and held a 27-23 lead with less than four minutes to go in the fourth quarter. Bengals safety Shawn Williams was ejected earlier in the game on an unnecessary roughness call for a helmet-to-helmet hit on Andrew Luck and was replaced in the secondary by Clayton Fejedelem. With the Colts driving to win the game late in the fourth, Fejedelem hit Colts TE Jack Doyle forcing a fumble and returned it 83-yards for a touchdown, sealing the victory for the Bengals.

Week 2: vs. Baltimore Ravens

The Bengals played their division rival, the Baltimore Ravens, in their home opener on Thursday Night Football and started the night on fire. WR A. J. Green caught three touchdown passes in the first half to give the Bengals an early 21-0 lead. Dalton added another touchdown pass to WR Tyler Boyd, but the Ravens closed the cap with TE Mark Andrews hauling in a Joe Flacco touchdown pass to cut the Ravens deficit to 14 at halftime. After a Justin Tucker field goal closed the gap even further in the third quarter, Ravens WR John Brown caught a 21-yard touchdown pass from Flacco to get the Ravens within five with less than 10 minutes to go in the game. Cincinnati tacked on a field goal to increase the lead to eight with just under three minutes to go in the game. With the Ravens trying to tie the game, Bengals safety Shawn Williams got a strip-sack on Flacco and the Bengals recovered the fumble. Cincinnati added a 40-yard field goal by Randy Bullock to put the game out of reach and start the season 2-0 for the first time since 2015.

Week 3: at Carolina Panthers

The Bengals faced the Panthers in their second road game of the season and took an early lead on a Giovani Bernard TD run, but the Panthers answered back with a Cam Newton TD run. Later in the first quarter Andy Dalton threw his first interception of the day, a pass intended for John Ross, but it was intercepted by Donte Jackson. In the second quarter, WR Devin Funchess and RB C. J. Anderson both caught TD passes from Newton and Carolina took a 21–14 lead into the half. In the third, Dalton was picked off again by Efe Obada and a second Newton TD run extended the Panthers lead to 14. Cincinnati soon followed with a TD by WR Tyler Boyd decreasing the Panthers' lead to seven. With less than four minutes to go in the game, another Dalton pass intended for Ross was once again intercepted by Jackson. A Graham Gano field goal made the score 31–21 and in the last few seconds of the game Dalton threw a pass intended for Tyler Eifert in the end zone, but was picked by Luke Kuechly for Dalton's fourth interception of the game. The loss drops the Bengals to 2–1.

Week 4: at Atlanta Falcons

For the second-straight week, the Bengals were on the road against an opponent from the NFC South, the Atlanta Falcons. The scoring started early as Falcons rookie RB Ito Smith scored his first NFL TD on the opening possession of the game. The Bengals started scoring some points of their own in the first quarter with a 15-yard TD pass from Andy Dalton to Tyler Eifert and a Giovani Bernard TD run to give the Bengals a 14–7 lead after one. Points continued to be put on the board in the second quarter with TE Logan Paulsen hauling in a TD pass from Matt Ryan, but Cincinnati answered quickly with John Ross' second TD of the season. Matt Ryan's second TD pass of the game to Calvin Ridley tied the game and the Bengals quickly regained the lead on Giovani Bernard's second TD run. Atlanta was able to get in field goal range at the end of the half and Matt Bryant kicked a 55-yard field goal to put the score at 28–24 in favor of the Bengals. The scoring slowed in the third quarter with a 28-yard Matt Bryant field goal being the only points added to the scoreboard, but the Bengals lost TE Tyler Eifert to a broken ankle. With the Bengals holding a 28–27 lead going into the fourth quarter, WR Calvin Ridley scored his second TD of the game to finally give the Falcons the lead, 33–28. Cincinnati and Atlanta then traded field goals to give the Falcons a 36–31 advantage with just over four minutes to go in the game. QB Andy Dalton led a 16 play, 75-yard drive, including two conversions on fourth down, that ended with a 13-yard TD pass to A. J. Green with seven seconds remaining on the clock. The Bengals failed on their two-point conversion, but kept the Falcons from scoring in the final seconds to improve to 3–1.

Week 5: vs. Miami Dolphins

In the first Sunday home game of the season, the Bengals (3–1) took on the Miami Dolphins (3–1) and the first score of the game didn't come until midway through the second quarter. A Kenyan Drake TD catch from Ryan Tannehill gave the Dolphins a 7–0 lead and then a punt return by Jakeem Grant put the Dolphins up 14–0 at the half. The Bengals and Dolphins traded field goals in the third quarter as Miami took a 17–3 lead into the fourth quarter. The Bengals cut the deficit to 7 after Joe Mixon caught a TD pass from QB Andy Dalton, who threw the ball up as he was being sacked. Then the Bengals defense took over with DE Michael Johnson intercepting a Ryan Tannehill pass, one that hit his own offensive lineman, and took it 22-yards for a TD. After a Randy Bullock field goal and with the Bengals leading 20–17, DE Carlos Dunlap had a strip-sack on Tannehill and the fumble was recovered by rookie DE Sam Hubbard, who returned 19-yards for a TD. The Bengals would hold on to win 27–17 and remain in first place in the AFC North with a 4–1 record.

Week 6: vs. Pittsburgh Steelers

After scoring 27 unanswered points to get the win last week, the Bengals hosted the arch rival Pittsburgh Steelers for the first of two meeting this season. The Bengals scored first when Andy Dalton found Tyler Boyd on a 2-yard pass to make it 7–0 for the only points of the first quarter. In the second quarter, the Steelers took the lead when James Conner ran for two 1-yard touchdowns to make it 7–7 and then 14–7. The Bengals managed to tie the game up at halftime when Dalton found Boyd again on a 14-yard pass to make it 14–14. In the third quarter, the Steelers regained the lead when Chris Boswell kicked a 21-yard field goal to make it 17–14. The Steelers would increase their lead in the fourth quarter when Boswell kicked another field goal from 24 yards out to make it 20–14.  The Bengals drove down the field and took the lead when Joe Mixon ran for a 4-yard touchdown to make it 21–20 with just over a minute to go in the game. The Steelers completed the comeback though when Ben Roethlisberger found Antonio Brown on a 31-yard pass (with a successful 2-point conversion) to make the final score 28–21. The Bengals fall to 4–2 and are now tied with the Baltimore Ravens for the AFC North lead. The Steelers now sit only a half game back.

Week 7: at Kansas City Chiefs

NBC flexed this game from 1:00 pm. ET to primetime Sunday night and the Bengals came in with just a 1–8 record on Sunday Night under head coach Marvin Lewis. Kansas City took their opening drive 95-yards ending with a Kareem Hunt TD catch from QB Patrick Mahomes. Mahomes found Hunt again at the start of the second quarter to give the Chiefs a 14–0 lead. Andy Dalton and the Bengals responded with a 77-yard drive that ended with a TD catch by TE C. J. Uzomah. The Bengals defense continued to struggle in stopping the Chiefs explosive offense though and Kansas City scored 10 more points to take a 24–7 lead at halftime. The Bengals deficit grew in the third quarter with Kareem Hunt rushing for a TD and then Dalton threw a pick-six on the Bengals first offensive play of the second half to put the Chiefs ahead 38–7. Randy Bullock added a field goal to cut the deficit to 28, but Tyreek Hill's TD catch at the beginning of the fourth quarter put the Chiefs back up 35 where the score stood for the rest of the game. The Cincinnati defense gave up a season high 45 points and 551-yards of offense as the Bengals fell out of first place in the AFC North. Cincinnati is now 1–9 on Sunday night under Lewis while falling to 4-3 on the season.

Week 8: vs. Tampa Bay Buccaneers

The Bengals started off strong with two TD runs by Joe Mixon and a TD catch from Tyler Boyd to go up 21–0 with just over five minutes to go in the second quarter. The Bucs answered with a 60-yard pass to DeSean Jackson, but the Bengals answered right back with a 17–yard pass to A. J. Green. Tampa Bay added a field goal at the end of the half to trail 27–9. After Bucs QB Jameis Winston threw his fourth interception of the game, which was returned 21-yards for a TD by Jessie Bates, he was benched and Ryan Fitzpatrick took over for Tampa Bay. Fitzpatrick would orchestrate an 18-point comeback by leading drives that ended in a field goal and TD passes to Mike Evans and O.J. Howard. Fitzpatrick then connected with Chris Godwin on a two-point conversion to tie the game at 34 with 1:05 remaining on the clock. Andy Dalton lead an eight play, 50-yard drive that ended with a 44-yard field goal by Randy Bullock as time expired to win the game for the Bengals. Having held on for the victory, the Bengals have now recorded at least one victory at Paul Brown Stadium against each of the 31 other franchises.

The team improved to 5-3 as they head into their bye week.

Week 10: vs. New Orleans Saints

After a tough win at home over the Bucs, the Bengals stayed home for a game against the Saints.  In the first quarter, the Saints score first when Drew Brees found Michael Thomas a 7-yard pass to make it 7-0.  The Bengals would tie it up as Andy Dalton found John Ross on a 2-yard pass to make it 7-7.  In the second quarter, the Saints' offense exploded as they scored 4 touchdowns:  Brees found Mark Ingram II on a 28-yard pass.  This would be followed up by Alvin Kamara running for 2 touchdowns: from 4 and 1 yards out.  Finally, Brees found Thomas again on a 17-yard pass to make it 14-7, 21-7, 28-7, and then 35-7 at halftime.  In the third quarter, the Saints continued to dominate as Wil Lutz kicked a 29-yard field goal to make it 38-7.  This would be followed by Brees running for a 1-yard touchdown to make it 45-7.  Lutz then put up 2 more field goals in the fourth quarter from 42 and 41 yards out to make it 48-7 and then 51-7.  The Bengals scored later on in the quarter when backup QB Jeff Driskel ran for a 27-yard touchdown to make the final score 51-14.

With the loss, the Bengals fell to 5-4.

Week 11: at Baltimore Ravens

After a horrifying loss at home, the Bengals traveled to Baltimore for Game 2 against the Ravens.  In the first quarter, the Ravens made it 7-0 after Alex Collins ran for a 7-yard touchdown for the only score.  The Bengals however would tie the game up in the second quarter when Joe Mixon ran for a 1-yard touchdown to make it 7-7.  Justin Tucker would give his Ravens the lead back when he scored 2 field goals from 28 and 56 yards out to make it 10-7 and then 13-7 at halftime.  In the third quarter, the Bengals retook the lead when Andy Dalton found Matt Lengel on a 4-yard pass to make it 14-13.  They would increase their lead when Dalton threw another pass:  A 22-yard pass to John Ross to make it 21-13.  The Ravens however, managed to tie the game back up when Gus Edwards ran for an 11-yard touchdown (with a successful 2-point conversion) to make it 21-21.  In the fourth quarter, Tucker kicked his third field goal of the day: A 24-yard field goal to make it 24-21.  After that, the Ravens' defense was able to shut down the Bengals' offense and the Ravens held on for the win.

With the loss, the Bengals fell to 5-5.

Week 12: vs. Cleveland Browns

With their 7-game winning streak against the Browns snapped, the Bengals fell to 5-6. Making matters worse, quarterback Andy Dalton was injured in the third quarter after be tried to recover a fumble. Despite trailing 35-7 in the third quarter, the Bengals made it interesting late, but could not complete the comeback under backup Jeff Driskel. It was later revealed that Dalton would miss the remainder of the season with a broken thumb, ironically the same thumb he broke a few years earlier.

Week 13: vs. Denver Broncos
With the loss, the Bengals fell to 5-7. Making matters even worse than the week before, star receiver AJ Green was injured in the second quarter and had to be helped off by a cart. He was seen later slamming his helmet to the ground and screaming. It was later revealed that he would miss the rest of the season with a broken toe.

Week 14: at Los Angeles Chargers

With the loss, the Bengals dropped to 5-8.  The team is also guaranteed their third straight non-winning season.  They would 3-peat this process for the first time since the 2006-08 seasons.

Week 15: vs. Oakland Raiders
With the win, the Bengals improved to 6-8. This was Marvin Lewis's last win with the team. Despite leading 17-0 at one time, the Raiders continued to hang around, but were hurt by turnovers and drops. Despite the win, a Tennessee Titans win over the Washington Redskins eliminated the Bengals from playoff contention

Week 16: at Cleveland Browns

With the loss, the Bengals dropped to 6-9 assuring them last place in the AFC North.  The team also posted 3 consecutive losing seasons for the first time since the 2000-02 seasons.  They were also swept by the Browns for the first time since 2002.  The loss also assured that the team would finish last in the AFC North.

Week 17: at Pittsburgh Steelers
 With the loss, the Bengals finished their year with a record of 6-10. In Marvin Lewis's last game with the team, the Bengals lost a sluggish game to the Steelers, their 8th straight loss in the rivalry. Despite taking a 10-0 lead in the second quarter, the Steelers went on a 16-3 run to finish the game.

Standings

Division

Conference

References

External links
 

Cincinnati
Cincinnati Bengals seasons
Cincinnati Bengals